Valeri Stepanovich Tolchev (born January 1, 1956; died November 3, 2006 in Omsk) was a Russian professional football coach and a player.

External links
 Career summary by KLISF

References

1956 births
2006 deaths
Soviet footballers
FC Irtysh Omsk players
Russian football managers
FC Luch Vladivostok managers
Association football midfielders